The Sooke Fall Fair is an annual fair held in Sooke, British Columbia. It is held at the Sooke Community Hall on Vancouver Island, Canada, every September. Established in 1913, it is one of the Sooke community's longest-running annual events.

The fair holds competitions, with adult and junior categories including photography, painting, drawing, embroidery, knitting, carving, preserves, vegetables, and baking. First Nations artwork and traditional crafts are also displayed.

No fair was held in 1917–18, 1942–44 & 2020.

See also
Other Canadian annual fairs
 Canadian National Exhibition - Toronto
 Calgary Stampede - Calgary
 Edmonton K-Days - Edmonton
 Pacific National Exhibition - Vancouver
 Central Canada Exhibition - Ottawa
 Canadian Lakehead Exhibition - Thunder Bay
 Markham Fair - Markham, Ontario
 Red River Exhibition - Winnipeg
 Royal Agricultural Winter Fair - Toronto
 Royal Manitoba Winter Fair - Brandon, Manitoba
 Schomberg Fair - Schomberg, Ontario
 Streetsville Bread and Honey Festival - Mississauga
 Western Fair - London, Ontario

External links
Sooke Fall Fair 

Annual fairs
1913 establishments in British Columbia
Fairs in British Columbia
Festivals established in 1913